Giuseppe Zappella (born May 4, 1973, in Milan) is an Italian football player.

Club career statistics

External links
 
 Profile at aic.football.it 
 

1973 births
Living people
Italian footballers
Italian expatriate footballers
A.C. Milan players
Como 1907 players
A.C. Monza players
U.S. Avellino 1912 players
U.S. Catanzaro 1929 players
U.S. Alessandria Calcio 1912 players
Urawa Red Diamonds players
Expatriate footballers in Japan
Italian expatriate sportspeople in Japan
J1 League players
A.S.D. Calcio Ivrea players
Serie B players
Vis Pesaro dal 1898 players
Association football defenders